The 2011–12 Vermont Catamounts season was their seventh in Hockey East. Led by head coach Tim Bothwell, the Catamounts will attempt to qualify for the NCAA hockey tournament.

Offseason

Recruiting

Exhibition

Regular season
November 3: The Vermont Catamounts won their first ever game at New Hampshire by a 4-1 tally at the Whittemore Center. Catamounts goalie Roxanne Douville made 33 saves, while freshman Amanda Pelkey notched a goal and an assist.
January 28 and 29: Amanda Pelkey had two goals and one assist as Vermont split a home and home series on versus New Hampshire. She had a total of ten shots on goal.

Standings

Schedule

Conference record

Awards and honors
Amanda Pelkey, Hockey East Rookie of the Week (Week of November 7, 2011)
Amanda Pelkey, Vermont, Hockey East Rookie of the Week (Week of January 31, 2011)

References

Vermont
Vermont Catamounts women's ice hockey seasons
Cata
Cata